HMCS Thunder (hull number MCB 153) was a  that served in the Royal Canadian Navy for three and a half months in 1954 before being sold to the French Navy to become La Paimpolaise. The ship was named for Thunder Bay and was the second vessel to carry the name. Her name was given to her replacement, .

Design
The Bay class were designed and ordered as replacements for the Second World War-era minesweepers that the Royal Canadian Navy operated at the time.

They had a complement of 38 officers and ratings.

The Bay-class minesweepers were powered by two GM 12-cylinder diesel engines driving two shafts creating . The ships were armed with one 40 mm Bofors gun and were equipped with minesweeping gear.

Service history
Thunders keel was laid down on 17 May 1951 by Canadian Vickers at their yard in Montreal, Quebec. The minesweeper was launched on 17 July 1952. The vessel was commissioned into the Royal Canadian Navy on 15 December 1953 with the hull identification number 144.

After commissioning spent three months in service with the Royal Canadian Navy. The minesweeper was paid off on 31 March 1954. She was transferred to France the same day, but the French flag was only raised aboard the ship on 1 April. The minesweeper was commissioned on 21 May 1954 and renamed La Paimpolaise. She served as a minesweeper until 1973 when the minesweeping gear was removed and she transferred to the Pacific for duty as an overseas territories patrol vessel. She was paid off 31 January 1987 and stricken later that year.

References

Notes

Citations

References
 
 
 
 
 

 

Bay-class minesweepers
Ships built in Quebec
1952 ships
Cold War minesweepers of Canada
Bay-class minesweepers of the French Navy
Cold War minesweepers of France
Minesweepers of the Royal Canadian Navy